The Stony River Subdivision is a railroad line owned by CSX Transportation in the U.S. state of West Virginia. At its north end the line connects with the Thomas Subdivision and at its south end the line comes to an end.

See also
 List of CSX Transportation lines

References

CSX Transportation lines